John Collins (March 1, 1776 – April 16, 1822) was an American manufacturer and politician from Delaware. He was a member of the Democratic-Republican Party and served as Governor of Delaware from 1821 to 1822.

Early life and family
He was born at Collins Mill Pond, in Nanticoke Hundred, Sussex County, Delaware, the son of Captain John and Mary Houston Collins. Captain John Collins had mined bog ore from his property and served twelve years in the Delaware General Assembly. The sister of the younger John, married future Governor David Hazzard. The younger John himself married Jane Hall, daughter of former Governor David Hall, and had six children, Theophilus, John, Joseph, Sarah, Catherine, and Martha. Their home was at the Collins Mill Pond in Nanticoke Hundred, where he continued the operation of a mill. It is believed they were members of the Methodist Church.

Political career
Collins was elected governor in 1820 by defeating the Federalist candidate, a longtime member of the General Assembly, Jesse Green. He was governor from January 16, 1821 until his death on April 16, 1822. Collins was known for his interest in improving public education. It was during his term that a controversial transit duty began being assessed to support the beginning of a new college in Newark. He also appointed Willard Hall, the future "father of public education," as secretary of state. Both of these actions would achieve results in later years.

Death and legacy
Collins died at Collins Mill Pond, in Nanticoke Hundred, Sussex County, Delaware. He is buried there on the family farm. No known portrait of John Collins exists.

Almanac
Elections were held on the first Tuesday of October. The governor takes office the third Tuesday in January, and had a three-year term.

References

External links
Biographical Directory of the Governors of the United States
Delaware’s Governors

The Political Graveyard

Places with more information
Delaware Historical Society; website; 505 North Market Street, Wilmington, Delaware 19801; (302) 655-7161
University of Delaware; Library website; 181 South College Avenue, Newark, Delaware 19717; (302) 831-2965

1776 births
1822 deaths
Methodists from Delaware
People from Sussex County, Delaware
Businesspeople from Delaware
Delaware Democratic-Republicans
Governors of Delaware
Burials in Sussex County, Delaware
Democratic-Republican Party state governors of the United States
People of colonial Delaware
19th-century American politicians